Richard Kamara is a Liberian association football player who has represented the Liberia national football team, and played for the Minnesota Twin Stars.

Minnesota Twin Stars 
Kamara began playing with the Minnesota Twin Stars of the NPSL in 2005. After displays of consistency in a developing club team, he helped lead them to two back-to-back Midwest Regional titles, in 2008 and 2009, captaining the side in the 2008 season. Along with earning the captaincy, he was given the honor of becoming a Midwest Regional All-Star team member, winning this award in three consecutive seasons ('08,'09,'10). In the 2010 season, solid performances in the back earned Kamara the Midwest MVP award, becoming the third Twin Star player to do so in three seasons.

Honours

Club
NPSL Midwest League (2) : 2008, 2009
NPSL National Finalist (1) : 2008

Individual
Midwest Regional All-Star team (3) : 2008, 2009, 2010
Midwest Regional MVP (1) : 2010

External links

Liberian footballers
Liberia international footballers
Year of birth missing (living people)
Living people
Association football defenders